Albert Cornell Chesley (born August 23, 1957) is a former American football linebacker in the National Football League. He was drafted by the Philadelphia Eagles in the 11th round of the 1979 NFL Draft. He played college football at Pittsburgh. Chesley is listed as the starting linebacker on the National Champion 1976 Pitt Panther squad.

Chesley was the Eagles starting inside linebacker in 1981, making 16 starts and recording two interceptions to go along with two fumble recoveries. He also had 133 tackles in 1981, but Philadelphia changed up their defensive scheme in 1982 with Chesley losing his starting spot. All told, Chesley played in 48 games while in Philadelphia. Chesley also was a member of the Chicago Bears.

After years of silence, Chesley came forward as a victim of sexual abuse as a child, at the hands of a neighborhood police officer. He was among a group of 200 men who appeared on an episode of The Oprah Winfrey Show holding pictures of themselves at the age when they began to suffer the abuse.

References

1957 births
Living people
Players of American football from Washington, D.C.
American football linebackers
Pittsburgh Panthers football players
Philadelphia Eagles players
Chicago Bears players
Eastern High School (Washington, D.C.) alumni